Mirko Barišić (born 5 November 1936) is a Croatian sportsman, businessman and entrepreneur who is the current president of Croatian football club Dinamo Zagreb. He was the vice-president of the club from 1967 to 1970, a member of the three-year presidency from 1989 to 1991, and the president of the club from 1990 to 1991, and again since 2000.

References

1936 births
Living people
Croatian sports executives and administrators
GNK Dinamo Zagreb